Vivienne G Meyrick (born 1937), is a female former swimmer who competed for England.

Swimming career
She represented England in the 110 yards backstroke at the 1954 British Empire and Commonwealth Games in Vancouver, Canada.

She was a member of the Saffron Walden Swimming Club and has a trophy named after her.

Personal life
She married John Crowe in 1965 and was known afterwards as Vivienne Crowe.

References

1937 births
English female swimmers
Swimmers at the 1954 British Empire and Commonwealth Games
Living people
Commonwealth Games competitors for England